Her Desher Vallis is an ancient river valley in the Coprates quadrangle of Mars, located at 25.4° S and 48.0° W.  It is 107.0 km across and was named for the Egyptian name for Mars.

Images

References 

Valleys and canyons on Mars
Coprates quadrangle